The 2020 2. divisjon (referred to as PostNord-ligaen for sponsorship reasons) was a Norwegian football third-tier league season. The league consisted of 28 teams divided into 2 groups of 14 teams. The groups were announced by the NFF on 7 December 2019.

Under normal circumstances, the league would have been played as a double round-robin tournament, where all teams play 26 matches. However, this season, due to the COVID-19 pandemic, the league was split after 13 rounds, meaning the teams only played each other once in this stage. The seven best ranked teams in each of the two groups qualified for a second stage, the promotion groups, where they were to play six more matches. The seven worst ranked teams in each of the two groups did not play any more matches after the first stage, and no teams were relegated.

On 12 November, four of the last six matches in group 1 were cancelled because the teams had nothing left to play for. The two teams finishing in first and second place had already been  determined. One match was also cancelled in group 2 for the same reason.

Team changes
The following teams changed division since the 2019 season.

To 2. divisjon
Promoted from 3. divisjon
 Eidsvold Turn
 Vålerenga 2
 Fløy-Flekkerøy
 Vard Haugesund
 Rosenborg 2
 Fløya

Relegated from 1. divisjon
 Notodden
 Skeid
 Tromsdalen

From 2. divisjon
Promoted to 1. divisjon
 Stjørdals-Blink
 Grorud
 Åsane

Relegated to 3. divisjon
 Vidar
 Sola
 Byåsen
 Elverum
 Oppsal
 Mjølner

League tables

Group 1

Promotion group 1

Group 2

Promotion group 2

Promotion play-offs

The teams who finished in second place in their respective group qualified for the promotion play-offs, where they faced each other over two legs. The winner, Asker then played against the 14th placed team in the 1. divisjon for a place in the 2021 1. divisjon.

2–2 on aggregate. Asker won 4–3 on penalties.

Top scorers

Group 1

Group 2

References

Norwegian Second Division seasons
3
Norway
Norway